Trash Truck or Giant Jack is an American computer animated streaming television series. Co-produced by Glen Keane Productions and Netflix Animation, the series premiered on November 10, 2020 on Netflix. A second season premiered on May 4, 2021.

A Christmas-themed special, titled A Trash Truck Christmas, was released on December 11, 2020.

Voice cast
 Henry Keane as Hank
 Glen Keane as Trash Truck
 Olive Keane as Olive
 Lucas Neff as Donny
 Brian Baumgartner as Walter
 Jackie Loeb as Ms. Mona

Production
The series was first announced in 2018.

Release
Trash Truck debuted on Netflix on November 10, 2020. A trailer was released on October 20, 2020. The series was followed by a Christmas special on December 11.

References

External links

2020 American television series debuts
2021 American television series endings
2020s American animated television series
2020s American children's television series
2020s preschool education television series
American children's animated adventure television series
American computer-animated television series
American preschool education television series
Animated preschool education television series
Animated television series about children
English-language Netflix original programming
Fictional cars
Television series by Netflix Animation
Netflix children's programming
Children's and Family Emmy Award winners